Zarya Yakutsk (Заря Якутск in Russian) was a futsal club based in Yakutsk, Russia. The club was founded in 1997, and last competed in the Russian Futsal High League.

Season to season

References

External links
 Profile at AMFR
 Official website (archived)

Futsal clubs in Russia
Futsal clubs established in 1997
Sport in Yakutsk
1997 establishments in Russia